Attur is a state legislative assembly constituency in Salem district in the Indian state of Tamil Nadu. Its State Assembly Constituency number is 82. It comprises a portion of Attur taluk, which includes the city of Attur. The constituency is part of the wider Kallakurichi constituency for national elections to the Parliament of India. The seat is reserved for candidates from the Scheduled Castes. It is one of the 234 State Legislative Assembly Constituencies in Tamil Nadu, in India.

Members of the Legislative Assembly

Madras State

Tamil Nadu

Election results

2021

2016

2011

2006

2001

1996

1991

1989

1984

1980

1977

1971

1967

1962

1957

1952

References

External links
 

Assembly constituencies of Tamil Nadu
Salem district